Bass Rise, known in Japan as , is a fishing video game developed by BEC and published by Bandai for PlayStation in 1999.

Reception

The game received mixed reviews according to the review aggregation website GameRankings. In Japan, however, Famitsu gave it a score of 30 out of 40.

References

External links
 

1999 video games
Bandai games
Fishing video games
PlayStation (console) games
PlayStation (console)-only games
Video games developed in Japan